Répression is the second studio album by French hard rock/metal band Trust. It was released in 1980 (in France) and was dedicated to Bon Scott, the recently deceased lead singer of AC/DC; the English version was released to other parts of the world later in the year.

Track listing
 All songs written by Bernard Bonvoisin and Norbert Krief.

Personnel

Trust
Bernard Bonvoisin: Vocals
Norbert Krief: Guitars
Yves Brusco: Bass
Jeannot Hanela: Drums, Percussion

Additional personnel
Bimbo Acok: Sax on track 7

References

1980 albums
Trust (French band) albums
Epic Records albums
CBS Disques albums
French-language albums